The Tataupa tinamou (Crypturellus tataupa) is a type of tinamou commonly found in dry forest in subtropical and tropical regions in southeastern South America.

Naming 
 Crypturellus is formed from three Latin or Greek words: kruptos meaning covered or hidden, oura meaning tail, and ellus meaning diminutive.  Therefore, Crypturellus means small hidden tail.
 Tataupa is a Guarani term, referring to the bird's ashy-colored plumage.

Taxonomy
All tinamou are from the family Tinamidae, and in the larger scheme are also ratites. Unlike other ratites, tinamous can fly, although in general, they are not strong fliers. All ratites evolved from prehistoric flying birds, and tinamous are the closest living relative of these birds.

Subspecies
The Tataupa tinamou has four subspecies as follows:
 C. t. tataupa Nominate race, occurs in eastern Bolivia, southern Brazil, northern Argentina, and Paraguay.
 C. t. inops occurs in northwestern Peru in the Marañón Valley,. and also extreme southern Ecuador
 C. t. peruvianus occurs in west central Peru in the Chanchamayo Valley of Junín Region.
 C. t. lepidotus occurs in northeastern Brazil; Bahia, Ceará, Piauí, Pernambuco, and Maranhão States.

Description
Its upper parts are dark brown, with a dark brown crown, a pale grey throat. It has darker grey on the sides of its head, neck, and breast, with a bu belly buff. Its bill and legs are purplish red.

Behavior

Like other tinamous, the tataupa tinamou eats fruit off the ground or low-lying bushes. They also eat small amounts of invertebrates, flower buds, tender leaves, seeds, and roots. The male incubates the eggs which may come from as many as 4 different females, and then will raise them until they are ready to be on their own, usually 2–3 weeks. The nest is located on the ground in dense brush or between raised root buttresses.

Range and habitat
The Tataupa tinamou prefers dry forest up to  altitude. It may also be found in lowland moist forest and degraded former forest habitats. This species is native to northeastern Brazil, eastern Bolivia, northern Argentina, Paraguay and western Peru in South America. It also has been sighted in extreme southern Ecuador.

Conservation

Footnotes

References

External links
Tataupa Tinamou videos, photos & sounds on the Internet Bird Collection
Tataupa Tinamou photo gallely VIREO
Tataupa Tinamou: Photos and vocalizations The Avifauna of the Interior of Ceará, Brazil

tataupa tinamou
tataupa tinamou
Birds of the Caatinga
Birds of the Pantanal
Birds of the Gran Chaco
Birds of Brazil
Birds of Bolivia
Birds of the Atlantic Forest
Birds of Peru
Birds of Paraguay
tataupa tinamou